Nine Peaks is a mountain featuring numerous peaks on Vancouver Island, British Columbia, Canada, located  northeast of Tofino and  southeast of Big Interior Mountain.

History
Although there was significant mining activity in the area of Della Lake and Big Interior Mountain prior to the 1950s, no record was made of any ascent of Nine Peaks. The first recorded ascent was by the Syd Watt's Alpine Club of Canada party in July 1955.

Access
Adventurous hikers and mountaineers reach Nine Peaks from Della Lake. Two infrequently accessed routes to Della Lake are:

1. From the base of Della Falls, follow a faint route with bits of flagging up the left (south) side of the falls. The route is steep and mossy, requiring bush and branch climbing.

2. From Bedwell Lake, ascend Big Interior Mountain, cross over to its south summit (Marjorie's Load), and descend to the pass west of Della Lake.

See also
 List of mountains in Canada
 List of mountains in Strathcona Provincial Park

References

Vancouver Island Ranges
Mid Vancouver Island
One-thousanders of British Columbia
Clayoquot Land District